Jean Mone (c. 1500 – c. 1548) was a Brabant sculptor, summoned from Spain to the Netherlands by Roman emperor Charles V in 1520.

Mone was born in Metz. He worked to introduce Italian Renaissance style to Brabant's sculpture. Mone spent most of his career in the Netherlands and worked in Brussels, Antwerp and Mechelen. The high altar near Brussels (1533) was one of his first works for the Emperor. He did also the statues of St Peter and Paul in the Maison du Roi in Brussels. He died in Brussels.

References

External links
 

1500 births
1548 deaths
Early Netherlandish sculptors